Lawrence Canfield Turville (June 4, 1949 – October 10, 2020) was an American professional tennis player.

Turville, raised in St. Petersburg, Florida, was the son of Edward Turville, a non playing captain of the U.S. Davis Cup team during the early 1970s. The top ranked 18s player in Florida, Turville played collegiate tennis for Georgia Tech and earned All-American honors in 1970, reaching the fourth round of the NCAA championships. In 1971 he set up a series of satellite tournaments in Florida with his friend Armistead Neely, which were known as the World Association of Tennis Champions (WATCH) Circuit. His professional career included doubles main draw appearances at the French Open and Wimbledon. In 1979 he began an 18-year long reign as the Rice University men's head coach.

References

External links
 
 

1949 births
2020 deaths
American male tennis players
Georgia Tech Yellow Jackets men's tennis players
Rice Owls men's tennis coaches
American tennis coaches
Tennis people from Florida
Sportspeople from St. Petersburg, Florida